Crop Circles is the fourth studio album by Canadian country music artist Dean Brody. It was released on November 5, 2013, via Open Road Recordings. The first single, "Bounty", featuring guest vocals from Lindi Ortega, was released in August 2013.

Crop Circles won Country Album of the Year at the 2014 Juno Awards.

Critical reception
Shenieka Russell-Metcalf of Top Country gave the album five stars out of five, writing that "the album's lyrical content and music is pure brilliant."

Track listing

Chart performance

Album

Singles

References

2013 albums
Dean Brody albums
Open Road Recordings albums
Canadian Country Music Association Album of the Year albums
Juno Award for Country Album of the Year albums